The Kenyon Collegian is the official student newspaper of Kenyon College.  The paper is published weekly from Peirce Hall. An alumni group of past Collegian staffers has formed. Notable Collegian alumni include Matt Winkler of Bloomberg, Renee Peck, Jay Cocks, Jim Borgman, Bill Watterson, and P. F. Kluge, the paper's adviser emeritus and author of Eddie and the Cruisers.

External links 

Official site of past Collegian staffers

Student newspapers published in Ohio
Publications with year of establishment missing
Kenyon College